Aiea or Aiea may refer to:
 Members of the Hawaiian flowering plant genus Nothocestrum 
Nothocestrum breviflorum A.Gray -  Smallflower aiea (island of Hawaii)
 Nothocestrum latifolium A.Gray - Broadleaf aiea (Maui, Molokai, Lānai, Oahu, Kauai)
 Nothocestrum longifolium A.Gray Longleaf aiea (island of Hawaii, Maui, Molokai, Lānai, Oahu, Kauai)
 Nothocestrum peltatum Skottsb. Oahu aiea (Kauai)
 Ilex anomala, a species of holly that is also endemic to Hawaii
 Aiea, Hawaii, a CDP of Honolulu on the island of Oahu
 AIEA or IAEA, International Atomic Energy Agency, an international organization that seeks to promote the peaceful use of nuclear energy, and to inhibit its use for any military purpose, including nuclear weapons